Bradeley is a village in Staffordshire, England, in the city of Stoke-on-Trent.  It was mentioned in the Domesday Book but became more established as a mining community for the local coal pits in Norton and Chatterley Whitfield. A hostel existed on the east side of Chell Heath Road until the 1970s, where incoming miners from different parts of Britain and also overseas would be housed.

There were several farms around the village which gradually sold for development. Some former farmland is now used for sport and recreation.

In the 1960s there were three churches; an Anglican, a Methodist church in Brammer Street and a Primitive Methodist church in Unwin Street. Today there is a new non-denominational church called Emmanuel church on Chell Heath Road, close to the site of the original Church of England church. Nearby is The Kingdom Hall of Jehovah's Witnesses.

A Co-Op grocery store stood on Moorland View with an attached butchers shop. Moorland View also boasts a public house called The Talbot Inn at the junction with Unwin Street and, at one time, Bradeley Workingmens Club on a site that is awaiting redevelopment. On Unwin Street there was a post office which was eventually transferred to the shop on the corner of Chell Heath Road and Hayes Street but has since been closed; it now serves as a sandwich shop. There were also a number of corner stores selling confectionery, ice cream, etc. A small store is located within the Bradeley Village retirement community located on Brammer Street, to serve the residents there.

A public house named The Bradeley was built in the 1970s when housing was built and Stratheden Road opened up a link from Bradeley to High Lane and onwards to Burslem.

Bradeley was also known for brickmaking until the early 1970s - the Wilkinson Bros. factory was located at Acreswood, on the west side of the village, where clay was drawn from a pit and high quality bricks made.

Notes
David Steele, international English cricketer, was born in Bradeley in 1941.

References

External links
 Wilkinson Bros brick factory
 Miners' housing
 Potteries.org reference

Villages in Staffordshire